Dissent or Descent is an album by American jazz pianist/composer Horace Tapscott recorded in 1984 but not released on the Nimbus West label until 1998.

Reception

AllMusic awarded the album 4 stars with its review by Don Snowden stating, "Tapscott's playing with the trio is fairly muted, with more emphasis put on his formidable melodic gifts than any virtuoso turns. Dissent or Descent may not be the best music any of these musicians created but it's a good example of solid, tasteful professionalism".

Track listing
All compositions by Horace Tapscott except as indicated
 "As a Child" - 7:09
 "Sandy and Niles" - 7:33
 "To the Great House" - 11:57
 "Spellbound" (Clifford Jordan) - 14:14
 "Ballad for Samuel" - 7:45
 "Ruby, My Dear" (Thelonious Monk) - 10:23
 "Chico's Back in Town" - 8:07

Personnel
Horace Tapscott - piano
Fred Hopkins - bass
Ben Riley - drums

References

Horace Tapscott albums
1998 albums